WHZK-LP (97.7 FM) is a radio station licensed to Greenwood, South Carolina, United States. The station is currently owned by South Carolina Mass Choir, Inc.

References

External links
 

HZK-LP
HZK-LP
Greenwood County, South Carolina